is a Japanese manga series written and illustrated by Kentaro Miura. It was serialized in Hakusensha's seinen manga magazine Young Animal from November 2013 to March 2014, with its chapters collected in a single tankōbon volume.

Plot
The story is set 100 million years in the future after an event called the Great Destruction. Colossal bugs-like monsters roam the wastelands, used by the Empire of Olympus in their epic war against Alcyoneus and his nether-forces. The gladiator Delos, the mystic Prome, and the titan Gohra are tasked to end the bloodshed and heal the planet.

Publication
Written and illustrated by Kentaro Miura, Giganto Maxia was Miura's first completely original work in 24 years since Berserk. It was serialized for six chapters in Hakusensha's seinen manga magazine Young Animal from November 22, 2013, to February 14, 2014.<ref></p></ref> A bonus chapter was published on March 14, 2014. Hakusensha collected its chapters in a single tankōbon volume, released on July 29, 2014.

In North America, the series was licensed for English release by Dark Horse Comics. The collected volume was released on February 3, 2016.

Volume

References

Further reading

External links
Giganto Maxia official website at Young Animal 

Adventure anime and manga
Hakusensha manga
Post-apocalyptic anime and manga
Science fantasy anime and manga
Seinen manga